İlhan Şeşen (born June 18, 1948; Manisa) is a Turkish musician and artist.

Career 
İlhan Şeşen started his music life in 1968. In 1971, he released an album named "Kavga". In 1983, he founded Grup Gündoğarken with Gökhan and Burhan Şeşen. In 2001, Şeşen released his second solo album, named "Neler Oluyor Bize?". After that, in 2003, Şeşen released "Ben Bu Şarkıları Kime Söyleyeyim?". After the release of this album, he took a role in the TRT TV show Mühürlü Güller. In 2004, he took a role in famous TV show Aliye. In 2005, he released his 4. album, "Aşk Yalan". In 2007, he continued his TV career with several additional TV shows. Famous song of Leman Sam, named "Rüzgar" is one of the songs written by İlhan Şeşen.

Albums 
 Aşk Haklı (1994) (Türker Production)
 Neler Oluyor Bize (2001) (DMC)
 Şimdi Ben Bu Şarkıları Kime Söyleyeyim (2003) (DMC)
 Aşk Yalan (2005) (DMC)
 İlhan Şeşen (2006) (DMC)
 Gel (14 July 2014) (Aşk Müzik Production)
 Yedi Bölge İki Gölge (15 February 2017) (Poll)
 İstanbul'lu Şarkılar (26 May 2017) (Sony)
 Ciddi Eğlence (20 April 2018) (Sony)
 Akustik Hikayeler (2 October 2020) (Sony)
 Basmakalıp (23 September 2022) (Sony)

Filmography 
 Aşk Üzerine Söylenmemiş Her Şey (1995)
 Cesur Kuşku (2001)
 Yeditepe İstanbul (2001)
 Bir Tatlı Huzur (2002)
 Mumya Firarda (2002)
 Mühürlü Güller (2003)
 Aliye (2004)
 Çocuğun Var Derdin Var (2004)
 Annem (2007)
 Şöhret Okulu (2007)
 Gönülçelen (2010)
 Anadolu Kartalları (2011)
 Bir Günah Gibi (2011)
 Hayatımın Rolü (2012)
 Görüş Günü Kadınları (2013)
 Asla Vazgeçme (2014)
 Paramparça  (2015)
 Milat (2015)
 Saklı (2015)
 The Yetimler (2015)
 Aşk Yalanı Sever (2016)
 Propaganda 2 (2016)
 Saklambaç  (2016)
 Tatlı Şeyler (2017)

See also 
 Grup Gündoğarken

References

1948 births
Living people
Turkish male film actors
Turkish male television actors
Turkish musicians
Istanbul University Faculty of Law alumni